Madeleine Peyroux (born April 18, 1974) is an American jazz singer and songwriter who began her career as a teenager on the streets of Paris. She sang vintage jazz and blues songs before finding mainstream success in 2004 when her album Careless Love sold half a million copies.

Music career
A native of Athens, Georgia, Peyroux grew up in New York and California. In interviews, she has called her parents "hippies" and "eccentric educators" who helped her pursue a career in music. As a child, she listened to her father's old records and learned to play her mother's ukulele.

When she was thirteen, Peyroux's parents divorced, and she moved with her mother to Paris. Two years later she began singing with street musicians in the Latin Quarter. She joined a vintage jazz group called the Riverboat Shufflers, then The Lost Wandering Blues and Jazz Band, with whom she toured Europe.

Discovery and breakthrough
Peyroux was discovered by a talent agent from Atlantic Records, which released her debut album, Dreamland (1996). She recorded cover versions of songs from the 1930s and '40s (Billie Holiday, Bessie Smith, Fats Waller) with a group of seasoned musicians: James Carter, Cyrus Chestnut, Leon Parker, Vernon Reid, and Marc Ribot. A year later she covered the song "Life is Fine" for a Rainer Ptacek tribute album.

In 2004 she released the EP Got You on My Mind with William Galison. Her second full-length album, Careless Love, was released by Rounder Records and produced by Larry Klein. Careless Love was certified gold by the Recording Industry Association of America (RIAA) after having sold half a million copies. It included songs by musicians such as Bob Dylan, Hank Williams, and Leonard Cohen. Klein produced her next album, Half the Perfect World, which was recorded with Jesse Harris, k.d. lang, and Walter Becker. Half the Perfect World reached No. 33 on the Billboard magazine Top 200 albums chart. Klein and Becker returned to work with Peyroux on her album Bare Bones (Rounder, 2009). She wrote all the songs on the album, co-writing some with Klein and Becker and Julian Coryell. Two years later, Standing on the Rooftop was released by Decca Records, produced by
Craig Street, and recorded with Christopher Bruce, Charley Drayton, Meshell Ndegeocello, Marc Ribot, Jenny Scheinman, and Allen Toussaint.

In 2006, she performed a live session at Abbey Road Studios in England which was released on the album Live from Abbey Road. During the next year she won Best International Jazz Artist at the BBC Jazz Awards.

Reception 
In 2013 a New York Times music writer compared her vocal style to that of Billie Holiday, Ella Fitzgerald, and Edith Piaf. Her song "A Prayer" appeared in the television show Deadwood (2005), and her version of "J'ai deux amours" was included in the film Diplomacy (2014).

Discography

Solo

Collaborations and guest appearances
With William Galison 
 Got You on My Mind (Waking Up, 2004)

With The Lost Wandering Blues and Jazz Band
 Spreading Rhythm Around

With The Sachal Ensemble
 Song of Lahore (Universal, 2016)

References

External links

 Official site
 Discography at Discogs

1974 births
American expatriates in France
American women jazz singers
American women singer-songwriters
American jazz singers
Atlantic Records artists
Decca Records artists
Rounder Records artists
French-language singers of the United States
Guitarists from Georgia (U.S. state)
Guitarists from New York City
Living people
Musicians from Athens, Georgia
Singers from New York City
Torch singers
Jazz musicians from New York (state)
21st-century American women singers
21st-century American women guitarists
21st-century American guitarists
21st-century American singers
Singer-songwriters from New York (state)
Singer-songwriters from Georgia (U.S. state)